Praça XV Station (Portuguese: Estação Praça XV) is a ferry terminal in Rio de Janeiro, Brazil. The terminal is located on the Praça XV de Novembro and is operated by CCR Barcas.

Destinations
Routes serviced by the terminal include Niterói, Paquetá, Cocotá and Charitas.

Connections
Connections can be made to the municipal bus system at the nearby  after the closure of Misericórdia Bus Terminal in November 2014.

This place is also served by Rio de Janeiro VLT tram.

References

Ferry terminals in Brazil
Public transport in Rio de Janeiro (city)